The 1995 Bath and North East Somerset Council election was held on Thursday 4 May 1995 to elect councillors to the new Bath and North East Somerset Council in England. It took place on the same day as other district council elections in the United Kingdom.

These were the first elections to the new unitary council, which would come into effect on 1 April 1996. The new unitary authority replaced Bath City, Wansdyke District and Avon County Councils. The previous elections in for Bath City took place in May 1994, Avon County in May 1993 and Wansdyke District in May 1991. Future elections would take place every four years, with the next election scheduled for 6 May 1999.

The 1995 election saw no party take a majority of seats on the Council, with the Liberal Democrats being the largest party.

Election results

Ward results
Sitting councillors on Bath City Council or Wansdyke District Council are marked with an asterisk (*), sitting councillors on Avon County Council are marked with a plus (+).

Abbey

Bathavon North

Bathavon South

Bathwick

Bloomfield

Cameley

Chew Valley North & Clutton

Chew Valley South

Chew Valley West

Combe Down

Farmborough & High Littleton

Keynsham East

Keynsham North

Keynsham South

Keynsham West

Kingsmead

Lambridge

Lansdown

Lyncombe

Midsomer Norton North

Midsomer Norton Redfield

Newbridge

Newton St Loe

Oldfield

Paulton

Peasedown

Radstock

Saltford

Southdown

Timsbury

Twerton

Walcot

Westfield

Westmoreland

Weston

Widcombe

By-elections between 1996 and 1999

Abbey

Weston

References

1995 English local elections
1995
1990s in Somerset